Tybjerg Church is a Church of Denmark parish church situated on a small hill in the village of Tybjerg, just east of Tybjerggaard, Næstved Municipality, Denmark.

History
The church was constructed around 1175. It is the namesake of the local , whose seal features an image of Our Lady, indicating that the church was most likely dedicated to her.  The church belonged to the bishops of Roskilde but was administrated from Skovkloster Abbey in Næstved, a situation which caused local dissatisfaction.

The church was confiscated by the Crown in connection with the Reformation. The church was annexed to the nearby Herlufmagle Church in 1681. The church gained its independence on 1 April 1917.

Architecture
The Romanesque nave and chancel are constructed of limestone from Faxe. The original windows in the north and east side of the chancel have been bricked up but can still be seen. A western brick extension of the nave was added around 1400.

A tower, sacristy, porch and south chapel were constructed in brick in the Late Gothic period (c. 1500). The blindings on the gable are of a type characteristic for churches on the southern part of Zealand. All the current windows date from a renovation in 1862–1863.

Church frescos
The church frescos in the chancel date from c. 1175. The church frescos in the nave were created by the so-called Højelse Workshop in 1435.

Furnishings
The auricular altarpiece was created by Abel Schröder the Younger in  658. The pulpit is from the 19th century but incorporates Renaissance-style elements from the 16th century. The triumphal arch is decorated with the coat of arms of the Basse family, featuring wild boars and squirrels.

Churchyard
 Otto Irminger Kaarsberg (18921970), Supreme Court justice
 Gustav Rønholt (19242014), politician
 Klaus Rønholt (18231944), World War II resistance fighter
 Peter Rønholt
 Peter Frederik Steinmann (18121804), military officer, politician and landowner

Gallery

References

External links

 Official website
 Burials in the church

Churches in Næstved Municipality
Churches in the Diocese of Roskilde
12th-century churches in Denmark
Lutheran churches converted from Roman Catholicism